Lentzea albida is a bacterium from the genus Lentzea which has been isolated from soil in Jiangxi, China. Lentzea albida produces staurosporine.

References

Pseudonocardiales
Bacteria described in 2001